Sir Roger Bentham Stevens, GCMG (8 June 1906 – 20 February 1980) was a British academic, diplomat and civil servant.

Life
Stevens was born 8 June 1906. He was educated at Wellington College and Queen's College, Oxford. He married his first wife, Constance Hallam Hipwell (died 1976), in 1931, and they later had a son, Bryan Constant Sebastian Bentham Stevens.  His second wife was Jane Chandler (née Irving), whom he married in 1977.  He died on 20 February 1980, and she deposited his papers in the Churchill Archives, University of Cambridge in 1984.

Diplomatic career
In 1928 Stevens entered the UK Consular Service, serving in Buenos Aires, New York City, Antwerp, Denver, and the Foreign Office in London.

In 1951 he was appointed British Ambassador to Sweden, then in 1954, British Ambassador to Persia.  He wrote two books on Persia, The Land of the Great Sophy (1962) and First View of Persia (1964), and continued to contribute to academic journals on the same subject in later life. In 1958 he returned to London as Deputy Under-Secretary of State, Foreign Office, until 1963.

Other activities
In 1963 he took up the position of Vice-Chancellor of the University of Leeds which he held until 1970. Other positions were:
Advisor to First Secretary of State on Central Africa, 1963–1970
Chairman of Yorkshire and Humberside Economic Planning Council, 1965–1970,
Panel of Inquiry into Greater London Development Plan member, 1970–1972,
Chairman of the Committee on Mineral Planning Control, 1972–1974,
United Nations Administrative Tribunal (UNAT) member, 1972–1977.

Honours

Stevens was a KCMG and later GCMG.
He is commemorated in the Roger Stevens Building on the campus of Leeds University.

References

D. Wright (1981) Iran, Vol. 19, pp. iii–iv Sir Roger Stevens, G.C.M.G.

1906 births
1980 deaths
People educated at Wellington College, Berkshire
Alumni of The Queen's College, Oxford
Vice-Chancellors of the University of Leeds
Knights Grand Cross of the Order of St Michael and St George
Ambassadors of the United Kingdom to Iran
Ambassadors of the United Kingdom to Sweden
British expatriates in Argentina
British expatriates in the United States
British expatriates in Belgium